Ian Irving Vega Tayao is a Filipino musician, producer, vlogger and skateboarder, known for fronting the bands Queso (formerly Cheese), Wilabaliw, and Armalite.

Hailed as one of the Philippines' "Three Kings of Slam" (along with Greyhoundz's Reg Rubio and Slapshock's Jamir Garcia), he is well known for his aggressive yet experimental musicianship.

Music career

Cheese (1994 to present)

1994, Queso started out using the name Cheese. It all began as something to do after eating cheese. Enzo Ruidera, 2TS Calinawan and Pao Rosal were cheese eater and decided to form a band. Eventually things got serious and they were winning battle of bands. The kids thought this might lead somewhere and eventually got Tayo, cousin of Power Rosario  to do vocal duties at the time both parties were starting to write original songs. So by the time they were ready to play they were already playing original songs in a time were playing covers. Landing regular gigs at hot spots back then like Club Dredd and Yosh Café, they steadily got noticed and slowly earned a following. CJ Olaguera who was constantly with the band eventually learned to play percussions and was a logical addition to the band because he was already always there anyway and he added new texture to the sound of the band. By the time, they were regulars at a number of bars and clubs. 8 Toleran, a neighbor and former guitarist of the band Piranha asked Ian if he could audition and join the band. As fate would have it, the band was actually looking for another guitar player. He fit in perfectly and he was in like that. RT de Ano, is another friend of the band and a DJ. He was another logical choice to be absorbed into the band because he was always there anyway and the idea of having a DJ in the band was shared by all of the members. By 1997, the band release and sold a two-song demo, the songs “Fine” and “The Way” were in it. Five thousand copies was sold out in a week. “Fine” eventually garnered airplay on NU107 and eventually hit the charts. The band was signed by Warner Music Philippines. In 1998, the self-titled debut album Cheese was released. Critics and fans alike received it beautifully. The singles "10x Karma" and "Fine" climbed the charts and the band was nominated on a number of categories at the ’99 NU107 Rock Awards. Maly Andres, the producer of the album won Producer of the Year award for his work on that album. The album went on to win an Awit Award for Rom Villaseran's work on the album cover layout. The band went on to a successful tour of the album, even going to Korea to represent the Philippines in the 2000 Pusan Rock Festival. After touring and playing provinces, special events, clubs and bars. The band went on to write new materials. Biboy Garcia who went on to record with the band on their sophomore effort replaced RT de Ano. 2001 saw the release of Cheese's second effort entitled Pilipinas. The album was critically acclaimed, named "the richest rock release of that year". The album went on to win Vocalist of the Year, People's Choice Award and Album of the Year in the 2002 NU107 Rock awards. The band went on to tour the new album, successfully. 2003, Queso officially announced that they were changing their name to Queso from Cheese because that is what the kids were calling them and it was only logical. That same year drummer Pow Rosal was replaced by drummer Robert dela Cruz. Robert came in to continue touring the album all throughout the country. In 2004, the band goes back to the studio to write new materials. 2005, Queso releases Buhay Queso, a DVD documentary about the band, members and their adventures. A year after, 2006, the band finishes recording and releases their latest self-titled effort Queso.

The band (along with Slapshock and Greyhoundz) headed the country's annual music festival PULP Summer Slam.

The band eventually broke up after the release of their third album but reunited in 2012. Currently, the band is still active, even though each member is busy with their other endeavors.

Wilabaliw (2010 to present)

Tayao conceptualized the project 8 years ago, back when he was still active with Queso. The perfect chance to manifest the idea did not become so vivid until he was able to cosmically find members or better yet the members finding him.

Consisting musicians from their respective bands: Tayao himself, Robert dela Cruz (his bandmate in Queso, also plays for Skychurch), Francis Magat (from Salindiwa) and Louis Isok (of Enemies of Saturn). The band played heavier stuff compared to their groups.

The debut album 10.10.10. was independently-released in 2010 (believed as one of the reasons for the album's title), unleashing tracks like the groovy "Me Techie Love You Long Time", hard-hitting "Diveler" and the hit single "Illuminate I". In 2012, they released their song "Samadi" through Tower of Doom's Tower Sessions program on YouTube .

At the end of 2013, the band's line-up changed as Magat and Dela Cruz were replaced by Nino Avenido (of Greyhoundz) and Jesso Ron "Pornstar" Montejo (of 4th Draztik). In the following year, the band released their song "Fahira", followed by "Not So Fast" not long after, which they turned up to the Wilabaliw TeeDee ( a combination of CD and T-Shirt) through Built by Sonic.

After two years, the band released new songs, called "Jack Stone", "Sunken ID" and "Hindi Na Makita" (also claimed as the band's first Tagalog song) in 2017. Before the year 2017 ended, line-up changed for the bassist as Nino Avenido was replaced by Keith Francisco (of Arcadia).

Armalite (2014 to present)

The quintet was formed in 2014, consists of Queso buddies Tayao, Ocho Toleran, Biboy Garcia with Martin Hocson and Michael Gemina, spawned songs such as "Smoke Screen" and "Halo Jump", which later turned into a CD, which was launched on December 17, 2014, at 19 East Parañaque.

Later, Gemina was replaced by Allan "Bords" Burdeos of Kamikazee, as stated in the band's Facebook page on October 20, 2016:

"Gonna start this off with a good evening to every single one of you and we hope everyone is safe given this weather we are/will be experiencing.

Just a quick update from us given we haven't posted in a really long time! -First off, we are still around and planning things for the future. We just all have our personal things to deal with now but we still can't thank everyone enough for the continued support despite not hearing from us for quite some time.

Second, for whoever doesn't know our original drummer Mike has migrated to Singapore to pursue his career and awesomeness over there and we couldn't be more happy and proud of him. We have this handsome fella filling in for drum duties when we get this ball rolling again. Does he look familiar? Stay stuck and trust us it will be worth the wait. "

Solo projects

Outside his bands, Tayao is still making music in his own movement. Collaborated with his musician friends such as Randy Pages, Wendell Garcia, and Louie Talan, in covering a song of another band Brain Salad titled "Bulong (Mo Sa Dilim)".
He also formed an acoustic project called BatCat, together with Nino Avenido and Zach Lucero of Imago.
He also collaborated with progressive/power metal group Plethora, with Greyhoundz' Audz Avenido on the song "Triangulo".
  
Tayao also recorded his own songs such as "Dandy", "Mauricio", "The Dragon That Never Sleeps" and "Pull The Plug".

Tayao collaborated on the song "Apatnapungbara" for Gloc 9's album MKNM: Mga Kwento Ng Makata in 2012, and later collaborated for the song "Tarantatula" from Wilabaliw's recently-released Aurum in 2019. He was also featured with Nicole Asensio on the love song "All in All", from Asensio's debut album Schizoprano in 2015.

In 2017, Tayao collaborated with metal band Vie for the song "Ganid".

In February 2018, Tayao collaborated with female-fronted band Saydie on their latest single "Yokai".

Musical styles

Musicians and listeners can't exactly define Tayao's musical sensibilities and styles. In Queso, he is regarded as part of the Filipino nu-metal scene. But since his voice is a fusion of reggae, funk, hard alternative and heavy metal, even playing with Wilabaliw and Armalite, his voice is the signature of his musicianship: familiar yet different, as FHM Philippines stated.

Theatrics
Tayao is also known for doing stunts during performances, such as high-angle backflips, 'complicated' dance moves and stage dives.

Other pursuits

Tayao is an affiliate of Ragdoll Development, a group of artists, videographers, and companies who support Filipino skaters.
He also created a Facebook show called "Timon and Pumba Live", along with Ramon Mager (of Sickpig).

In 2011, Tayao also starred in a short film entry for International Academy of Film and Television (IAFT) by Karl Porio, titled "The Gap" as the lead role of Danny.

Discography

With Cheese/Queso
Cheese (Warner Music Philippines, 1998)
Pilipinas (Warner Music Philippines, 2002)
Queso (EMI Music, 2006)

With Wilabaliw
10.10.10 (2010)
Aurum 2019

With Armalite
Armalite- Built to Kill (2014)

References

3. http://towerofdoom.net/queso/#tab-con-5

Living people
Musicians from Manila
21st-century Filipino male singers
Year of birth missing (living people)
20th-century Filipino male singers